Love Not Riots was a campaign aimed at reducing riots and violence that have become commonplace at festivals in the UK. It targeted the Reading and Leeds Festivals and Download festivals. It was officially endorsed by festival organisers Festival Republic, and supported by numerous celebrities and bands including ¡Forward, Russia!, The Automatic, The Subways, The Cribs, Goldie Lookin' Chain, McDonalds and Giant Drag.

References

External links
 Official SiteFrom Archive.org
 "Love Not Riots" at BBC.com
 "Love Not Riots" at Skiddle.com

Festivals in the United Kingdom
Riots and civil disorder in the United Kingdom
Society of the United Kingdom